The Double-headed eagles derby is a football derby between AEK Athens and PAOK Thessaloniki. Both teams have the same roots, being refugees from Constantinople (AEK in Athens and PAOK in Thessaloniki), after the Greco-Turkish War, the Asia Minor Catastrophe and the population exchange. Both teams use the same emblem (Double-headed eagle), to reminisce the Byzantine Empire, but in different colors (black and yellow for AEK, black and white for PAOK). The very first match between the two teams took place in Apostolos Nikolaidis Stadium during the final phase of the 1930–31 Panhellenic Championship (8 March 1931; score: 1–1). 
The rivalry used to remain on-pitch for several years. However, since the Greek Cup Final of 2017 there is an ongoing, intense and overall exaggeration of the rivalry, further boosted after the championship conquered by AEK in 2018, when PAOK were deducted 3 points by court decision and AEK were given 3pts, which adjudged the title holder.

Statistics

 OPAP Arena

Record Greek League win
 AEK
 Home: AEK – PAOK 6–2, Nikos Goumas Stadium, 24 April 1958 (Tzanoulas 9', 21', 38', 74', Kanakis 73', Nestoridis 87' – Gientzis 23', Kiourtzis 54')and AEK – PAOK 6–2, Nikos Goumas Stadium, 13 May 1962 (Zangilos 16', Nestoridis 24', 90', Tsachouridis 58', Gouvas 60', Skevofilakas 74' – Giakoumis 2', 50')and AEK – PAOK 6–2, Nikos Goumas Stadium, 8 May 2002(Tsiartas 2', Nikolaidis 24', 53', Lakis 41', Konstantinidis 62', Ivić 90'+2' – Voskaridis 85', 89')
 Away: PAOK – AEK 0–4, Toumba Stadium, 13 April 2008(Papastathopoulos 20', Blanco 23', Liberopoulos 25', Kallon 82')
 PAOK
 Home: PAOK – AEK 5–0, Toumba Stadium, 19 December 1982(Koudas 11', Kostikos 50', Dimopoulos 60', 69', 85')
 Away: AEK – PAOK 1–3, Corinth Municipal Stadium, 1 May 1983(Pellios 33' o.g. – Vasilakos 61', 90'+1', Koudas 82')
Record Greek Cup win
 AEK
 Home: AEK – PAOK 4–0, Nikos Goumas Stadium, 18 April 1965(Nestoridis 35' pen., 67', Papageorgiou 64', Papaioannou 89')
 Away: PAOK – AEK 0–4, Toumba Stadium, 6 February 2002(Tsiartas 27' pen., Lakis 39', Nikolaidis 47', Ivić 89')
 PAOK
 Home: PAOK – AEK 6–1, Toumba Stadium, 3 February 1982(Koudas 8', Dimopoulos 27', 52', 72', Guerino 66', Siggas 69' – Mavros 25')
 Away: AEK – PAOK 0–2, Chalcis Municipal Stadium, 10 June 1981(Damanakis 52', Georgopoulos 81')
Attendance record
 In Athens 
Greek League: 54,800 Athens Olympic Stadium, 14 September 1985
Greek Cup: 72,240 Athens Olympic Stadium, 29 June 1983
 In Thessaloniki 
Greek League: 45,252 Toumba Stadium, 19 December 1976 
Greek Cup: 44,045 Toumba Stadium, 9 February 1977

Matches list

Panhellenic Championship (1927–28 - 1958–59)

Super League Greece (1959–60 - present)

1 Match suspended at 72nd minute (score: 1–3). Remained as final result.
2 Match suspended at 90th minute (score: 1–0). Awarded 0–3 to AEK.

•There were no games in 2013–14 and 2014–15 seasons due to the relegation of AEK to lower divisions.

Greek Cup

• Series won: AEK 8, PAOK 14.

Top scorers

1 Vasilios Vasilakos has also scored once for PAOK against AEK

Penalties and red cards
Including all the Alpha Ethniki and Greek Cup games since 1959–60.

Head-to-head ranking in Super League

• Total: AEK 42 times higher, PAOK 21 times higher.

European records

AEK

PAOK

Last updated: 28 July 2022

Men in both teams

* Borbokis returned to AEK in 2002 after joining PAOK for 2 and a half years.

References

External links
The Rec.Sport.Soccer Statistics Foundation

Greece football derbies
AEK Athens F.C.
PAOK